6th TFCA Awards
December 18, 2002

Best Film: 
 Adaptation. 
The 6th Toronto Film Critics Association Awards, honoring the best in film for 2002, were held on 18 December 2002.

Winners
Best Actor:
Nicolas Cage – Adaptation.
Runners-Up: Daniel Day-Lewis – Gangs of New York and Jack Nicholson – About Schmidt

Best Actress:
Julianne Moore – Far from Heaven
Runners-Up: Maggie Gyllenhaal – Secretary and Isabelle Huppert – The Piano Teacher

Best Canadian Film:
Atanarjuat: The Fast Runner
Runners-Up: Fubar and Soft Shell Man

Best Director:
Paul Thomas Anderson – Punch-Drunk Love
Runners-Up: Alfonso Cuarón – Y Tu Mamá También and Todd Haynes – Far from Heaven

Best Documentary Film:
Bowling for Columbine
Runners-Up: Gambling, Gods and LSD and Standing in the Shadows of Motown

Best Film: 
Adaptation.
Runners-Up: Punch-Drunk Love and Y Tu Mamá También

Best First Feature:
Atanarjuat: The Fast Runner
Runners-Up: Confessions of a Dangerous Mind and Igby Goes Down

Best Screenplay:
Adaptation. – Charlie and Donald Kaufman
Runners-Up: The Hours – David Hare and Punch-Drunk Love – Paul Thomas Anderson

Best Supporting Actor:
Chris Cooper – Adaptation.
Runners-Up: Paul Newman – Road to Perdition and Dennis Quaid – Far from Heaven

Best Supporting Actress:
Emily Watson – Punch-Drunk Love
Runners-Up: Kathy Bates – About Schmidt and Toni Collette – About a Boy

Special citation to Richard Kelly's Donnie Darko as the best film not to receive a proper theatrical release in Canada.

References

2002
2002 film awards
2002 in Toronto
2002 in Canadian cinema